Shams el-Ghinnieh, released in 1991, is the second album from Najwa Karam.

Track listing
 "Shams el-Ghinnieh" (Sun of the Song)
 "Hab el-Hawa"  (The wind blows)
 "Wasse' Ya Dar" (Make the place bigger)
 "Ya Rakib Al Abbayah" (You who is on the Abbayah)
 "Habibi Ghab" (My Love is gone)
 "Bala Bala" (Yes, Yes)
 "Khelis el-Sahar" (The night has ended)

References

1992 albums
Najwa Karam albums